Afro-Turks are Turkish people of African Zanj descent, who trace their origin to the Ottoman slave trade like the Afro-Abkhazians. Afro-Turk population is estimated to be between 5,000 and 20,000 people. Afro-Turks are distinct from African immigrants in Turkey, who are around 100,000 individuals.

Denomination
Historically, the ancestors of the Black Turks were called Zenci (alternatively written as Zanji or Zangi in other languages), a word used during the Ottoman period for defining the people of the historic geographical region of Zanj along the Indian Ocean coast of Southeast Africa, where many Afro-Turks trace their ancestry. Many others came from Sudan, which was controlled by the Ottoman Khedivate of Egypt, in the 19th and early 20th centuries. Some Afro-Turks trace their ancestry to Ottoman North Africa, such as present-day Libya, Tunisia and Algeria.

History
Beginning several centuries ago, a number of Africans, usually via Zanzibar in the historical region of Zanj and from places such as Niger, Arabia, Libya, Kenya and Sudan, came to the Ottoman Empire settled by the Dalaman, Menderes and Gediz valleys, Manavgat and Çukurova. African quarters of 19th-century İzmir, including Sabırtaşı, Dolapkuyu, Tamaşalık, İkiçeşmelik and Ballıkuyu, are mentioned in contemporary records.

Some came from Crete following the population exchange between Greece and Turkey in 1923. They settled on the Aegean coast, mainly around İzmir. Africans in Ayvalık declare that their ancestors from Crete spoke Greek when they came to Turkey and learned Turkish later. Afro-Turks living in İzmir celebrated the traditional spring festival Dana Bayramı ("Calf Festival") until the 1960s. Dana Bayramı has currently been revived among the younger generation of Afro-Turks.

Ahmet Ali Çelikten, a combat pilot of the Ottoman Air Force during World War I, was the first black aviator in history.

Today
Areas with significant populations of Afro-Turks are in Turkey's Aegean and Marmara Region, especially Istanbul, İzmir, Aydın and Muğla provinces. People of African ancestry also live in some villages and municipalities of Antalya and Adana provinces. Some of the descendants of the African settlers remain, mixed with the rest of the population in these areas and many migrated to larger cities. Migration and assimilation make it difficult to estimate the number of Afro-Turks.

Notable Afro-Turks

Arts
 Esmeray (1949–2002), singer
 Tuğçe Güder (born 1984), adopted by Turkish parents, model and actress
 Kuzgun Acar (1928–1976), sculptor
 Safiye Ayla (1907–1998), musician
 Defne Joy Foster (1975–2011), actress, presenter (African American father)
 Tansel Öngel (born 1976), actor
 Selami Şahin (born 1948), musician, singer, songwriter

Sports
 Fercani Şener, footballer
 Ömer Besim Koşalay (1898–1956), athlete, journalist
 Vahap Özaltay (1908–1965), footballer
 Sadri Usluoğlu (1908–1987), basketball player and manager
 Colin Kazim-Richards
 Nazım Sangaré (born 1994), footballer
Paul Dawkins (1957-2019), basketball player
Murat Salar (born 1976), footballer, manager of SV Arminia Hannover
Bilal Başaçıkoğlu (born 1995), footballer
 Erol Erdal Alkan
 Muhaymin Mustafa
Kerim Frei (born 1993), footballer
Zeki Amdouni (born 2000), footballer

Literature
 Mustafa Olpak (1953–2016), writer and activist

Politics
Ayse Bircan (born 1954), activist and writer

Military
 Ahmet Ali Çelikten (1883–1969), Ottoman aviator 
 Black Musa (1880–1919), volunteer soldier at Special Organization

See also

Afro-Arabs
Afro-Iranians
Africans in Turkey
Slavery in the Ottoman Empire
Zanj

Notes

External links
  Afro-Turk Website of the Afro-Turks' association in Ayvalık
  Sessiz Bir Geçmişten Sesler Website of a research project on Afro-Turks
  ,  Today's Zaman, 25 June 2008
  , article published on 27 August 2012 about the Calf Fest, the Afro-Der Association and recent developments.
  , Qantara by Ekrem Eddy Güzeldere, 27.08.2012
  , Turkey's little-known African community, BBC, 07-09-2016

 
Turks
Ethnic groups in Turkey
 
African diaspora in the Middle East